The polysulfide-bromine battery (PSB; sometimes polysulphide-polybromide or "bromine-sulfur"), is a type of rechargeable electric battery, which stores electric energy in liquids, such as water-based solutions of two salts: sodium bromide and sodium polysulfide. It is an example and type of redox (reduction–oxidation) flow battery.

In 2002, a 12 MWe prototype electrical storage facility was built at Little Barford Power Station in the UK, which uses polysulfide bromide flow batteries. Although the facility was completed, due to engineering issues in scaling up the technology, it was never fully commissioned. A similar demonstration plant located at the Tennessee Valley Authority (TVA) facility in Columbus, Mississippi, United States was never completed.

Chemistry
Two different salt solution electrolytes are contained in two separate tanks. When energy is required, a solution of Na2S2 (sodium disulfide) is pumped to the anode, and NaBr3 (sodium tribromide) is pumped to the cathode. The anode and cathode, and their corresponding salt solutions, are separated by an ion exchange membrane. At the negative electrode, the anodic reaction is shown as:

2Na2S2 → Na2S4 + 2Na+ + 2e−

At the positive electrode, the cathodic reaction is shown as:

NaBr3 + 2Na+ + 2e−→ 3NaBr

As energy is drawn from the system, the sodium disulfide becomes sodium polysulfide, and the sodium tribromide becomes sodium bromide. This reaction can be reversed when a current is supplied to the electrodes, and the system chemical salts are recharged. The system is defined as a fuel cell because the electrodes are not consumed by the reaction, they act only as a surface for the reaction. However, nor is the liquid a fuel that is consumed. It is a salt solution electrolyte that is changed by the process.

History
Although possibilities of using polysulfide and bromine redox couples in flow and static batteries, have been mentioned before, it was Robert Remick and Peter Ang of the Institute of Gas Technology (Chicago), who were the first to demonstrate (and claim in a patent) a rechargeable (cycled) polysulfide-polybromide battery (SBB) in 1981.(1) They quickly secured a DOE grant for detailed studies, that revealed MoS2 as a preferred (yet less than ideal) electrocatalysis for the negode reaction.(2) 

In 1987 Stuart Licht, while at Northeastern University (Boston, Massachusetts), demonstrated extraordinary aqueous solubility of potassium sulfides, for example  3:1 water:salt  molar ratio for K2S and K2S4  solutions, albeit this work showed only half-cell electrochemistry.(3) Nevertheless, sodium chemistry remained the mainstream among polysulfide-polybromide RFB developers, perhaps because of  the higher solubility of NaBr (8.82 molal at 20 °C) compared to KBr (5.49 molal at 20 °C). 

In 1992 National Power PLC (which was formed in 1990 as a result of privatization of the UK’s electricity market) acquired from the Institute of Gas Technology the original US patent by Remick and Ang,(1) 
and started a research and development program in the field of polysulfide-polybromide RFB.  Initial work at National Power was done by Ralph Zito,(4, 5) who was famously known for his prior work on Zn-Br2 RFBs.(6-8) During the reorganization of the UK electricity market in the 1990’s, the National Power patents were transferred to Innogy Technology Ventures Ltd, which became in 2002 a subsidiary of the German multi-utility RWE group of companies. Regenesys Technologies Limited was spanned off RWE-Innogy with a task of expedient demonstration and commercialization of polysulfide-polybromide RFBs, which were branded as Regenesys® batteries. By year 2001 Regenesys employed over 70 people and demonstrated 5 and 10 kW stacks.(9) 

The Regenesys’ SBB development program was much more vigorous than those of its predecessors. By 1999 the Regenesys team discovered, that sulfur is irreversibly oxidized to sulfate in a side-reaction, which takes place mostly when a sulfur-containing species crosses into the posolyte. As their attempts to develop a system with a mixed polysulfide-bromide negolyte and sulfide-free posolyte using a Nafion membrane turned out unsuccessful, they suggested adding more solid sulfur or polysulfides to the negolyte as part of normal battery cycling-rebalancing.(10)  They also developed an ingenuine method to detect the onset of colloidal sulfur formation using electrokinetic sonic effect.(11) Although the early design of the Regenesys SBB was rather ineffective by modern standards (e.g. the membrane was not coated by catalytic layers, but rather was brought into a direct contact with 1.5 mm thick reticulated carbon electrodes on each side), it showed initial promise.(12) Notably, during charge at 34 mA/cm2 the overvoltage at the negative electrode (0.65 V) was significantly larger than the overvoltage on the positive electrode (0.075 V).(12) Transition metal sulfides (13) and other complexes (14) were suggested as electrocatalysts for the negode reaction. In a later design, the operating current density was increased to 80 mA/cm2.(10)

In 2001, the UK’s Department of Trade and Industry funded ca. 50% of the total ca. £2 mln. cost (apparently with an expected cost-share from RWE-Innogy) of building a 100 kW Regenesys® battery at Little Barford in central England next to an existing gas-peaker plant and a proposed windmill site.(9, 15) A similar plant was considered in Columbus, Mississippi in the USA, (16, 17)  as a part of the ill-fated Tennessee Valley Authority.(18) A hypothetical 15 MW-120 MWh in the UK was also proposed for years 2000-2002.(19, 20) However, jumping from 10 to 100 kW stack proved to be more difficult, than it was expected for a modular system like an RFB. Stack leakage was allegedly addressed by improving the seal design and manufacturing tolerances.(9) After these improvements, fractures of endplates, of electrodes and of PVDF-lined tanks were reported as predominant failure modes throughout the testing. These problems ((as well as aforementioned irreversible oxidation of sulfur to sulfate) were not addressed during the time available for this demonstration project. In 2003, after the Little Barford fiasco, RWE decided to abandon its Regenesys® technology (which was not invented at RWE, but rather inherited as a part of the Innogy acquisition). Apparently, RWE was unable to find a buyer for this divestiture, as its patents on this technology expired for non-paying maintenance fees in various countries between 2004 and 2013. The cost of developing the polysulfide-polybromide RFBs between 1990 and 2004, according to the company’s reports, amounted to over 140 mln. £.(21) In addition to this, Regenesys’ own studies published in 2009 questioned the technical feasibility of long-term operation and the profitability of the SBB.(22, 23) 

Others also explored the feasibility of polysulfide-polybromide battery (SBB). Ca. in 2002 Dalian Institute of Chemical Physics (PR China), which became by then the World’s leading flow battery developer, launched its own SBB program. In 2004-2006 they reported 1kW systems operating at 40mA/cm2 with the cycle energy efficiency improving from 67 to 82 % mostly due to the development of new electrode materials.(24-27) Nevertheless, the SBB patenting and publication activity significantly decreased after 2006. It is likely, that the problem of sulfur deposition in the porous negode during long-term cycling,(28) as well as the concomitant success of vanadium redox flow batteries, were the main reasons for scaling down SBB activities. Since ca. 2010 SBB development has been confined mostly to academic laboratories and to development of new electrocatalysts, which nevertheless fall short of the required activity and durability targets.(29, 30)

In more recent years, SBBs with Li+- (31) and Na+- (32) conducting ceramic separators have been demonstrated. Although these cells showed good cycle life (over 100 cycles without noticeable degradation), they were operated at ca. 1 mA/cm2 because of the high ohmic resistance of the separator. 

1.	J. Remick Robert and G. P. Ang Peter, "Electrically rechargeable anionically active reduction-oxidation electrical storage-supply system." 1981US-06299977 1981-09-08 (1981US-06299977 1981-09-08).
2.	R. Remick and E. Camara, Electrochemistry of the sulfide/polysulfide couple, in, Institute of Gas Technology, Chicago, IL (United States) (1983-07-01)  10.2172/5443566.
3.	S. Licht, "An energetic medium for electrochemical storage utilizing the high aqueous solubility of potassium polysulfide." J. Electrochem. Soc., 134, 2137 (1987)  10.1149/1.2100838.
4.	R. Zito, "Electrochemical energy storage and/or power delivery cell with ph control." 1993US-08128126 
5.	R. Zito, "Electrochemical apparatus for energy storage and/or power delivery comprising multi-compartment cells." 1993US-08128117 
6.	R. Zito Jr, "Storage battery having bromine positive active material." 1963US-04317507 1963-10-21 (1963US-04317507 1963-10-21).
7.	R. Zito Jr, "Zinc-bromine secondary cell." 1965US-04484556 1965-09-02 (1965US-04484556 1965-09-02).
8.	R. Zito, "Zinc-bromine battery with long term stability." 1982US-06441491 1
9.	Regenesys utility scale  energy storage: report (2004) https://www.osti.gov/etdeweb/servlets/purl/20517742 
10.	J. Morrissey Patrick, J. Mitchell Philip and E. Male Stewart, "Electrolyte rebalancing system." 1998GB-0015173 
11.	J. Morrissey Patrick and E. Cooley Graham, "Methods of detecting the onset of colloid formation in particular sulfur precipitation." 1999GB-0013185 
12.	E. Cooley Graham, E. Male Stewart, J. Mitchell Philip and I. a. N. Whyte, "Method of carrying out electrochemical reactions with an electrocatalyst." 1999GB-0001235 
13.	E. Cooley Graham, E. Male Stewart, J. Mitchell Philip and I. a. N. Whyte, "Method of carrying out electrochemical reactions with an electrocatalyst." 1999GB-0001235 
14.	S. Fletcher and J. Van Dijk Nicholas, "An electrode for the reduction of polysulfide species." 2002GB-0007214 
15.	B. Davidson, T. Calver, A. Price and D. Simchock, "Large-scale storage solution? Regenesys regenerative fuel cell." Renewable energy world, 3, 84 (2000) 
16.	I. N. D. Provided by Federal, Inc, Requesting proposals for completing TVA's Regenesys plant in Columbus, Mississippi, p. 1, Federal Information & News Dispatch, LLC, Washington (2004) 
18.	A. Ray, "TVA's public power institute (ppi): TVA board listening session on renewable energy." (2008) https://tva.maripo.com/tva_ppi.htm.
19.	P. Morrissey, "Regenesys: A new energy storage technology." International Journal of Ambient Energy, 21, 213 (2000)  10.1080/01430750.2000.9675376.
20.	Regenesys charges "giant battery", in TCE, p. 16 (2002) 
21.	Rwe abandons regenesys project, in The Guardian, p. 9 (2004) 
22.	D. P. R. Scamman, G. W. ; Roberts, E. P. L., "Numerical modelling of a bromide-polysulphide redox flow battery part 1: Modelling approach and validation for a pilot-scale system." Journal of Power Sources, 189, 1220 (2009)  10.1016/j.jpowsour.2009.01.071.
23.	D. P. R. Scamman, Gavin W. ; Roberts, Edward P. L., "Numerical modelling of a bromide-polysulphide redox flow battery. Part 2: Evaluation of a utility-scale system." Journal of Power Sources, 189, 1231 (2009)  10.1016/j.jpowsour.2009.01.076.
24.	Z. H. Z. H. Z. P. Y. Baolian, Research on electrode materials and systems for sodium polysulfide/bromine flow energy storage batteries, in 2004 China Materials Research Conference, p. 7, Beijing, China (2004) 
25.	P. Z. Zhao, Huamin ; Zhou, Hantao ; Yi, Baolian, "Nickel foam and carbon felt applications for sodium poly sulfide/bromine redox flow battery electrodes." Electrochimica Acta, 51, 1091 (2005)  10.1016/j.electacta.2005.06.008.
26.	H. Z. Zhou, Huamin ; Zhao, Ping ; Yi, Baolian, "Novel cobalt coated carbon felt as high performance negative electrode in sodium polysulfide/bromine redox flow battery." Electrochemistry (Tokyo, Jpn.), 74, 296 (2006)  10.5796/electrochemistry.74.296.
27.	H. Z. Zhou, Huamin ; Zhao, Ping ; Yi, Baolian, "A comparative study of carbon felt and activated carbon based electrodes for sodium polysulfide/bromine redox flow battery." Electrochimica Acta, 51, 6304 (2006)  10.1016/j.electacta.2006.03.106.
28.	Z. Hantao, "Study of sodium polysulfide/bromine flow energy storage batteries." Thesis (2006) 
29.	I. E. L. Stephens, C. Ducati and D. J. Fray, "Correlating microstructure and activity for polysulfide reduction and oxidation at ws2 electrocatalysts." Journal of the Electrochemical Society, 160, A757 (2013)  10.1149/2.027306jes.
30.	C. B. Bruneau, Yu-Jia ; Goenaga, Gabriel ; Zawodzinski, Tom, Catalyst study and characterization for a polysulfide bromine redox flow battery, in Abstracts, 66th Southeast Regional Meeting of the American Chemical Society, Nashville, TN, United States, October 16-19, SERMACS, American Chemical Society (2014) 
31.	L. N. W. Wang, X. F. ; Liu, J. Y. ; Yang, H. ; Fu, C. M. ; Xia, Y. Y. ; Liu, T. X., "A rechargeable metal-free full-liquid sulfur-bromine battery for sustainable energy storage." Journal of Materials Chemistry A, 6, 20737 (2018)  10.1039/c8ta07951j.
32.	M. M. Gross and A. Manthiram, "Long-life polysulfide-polyhalide batteries with a mediator-ion solid electrolyte." Acs Applied Energy Materials, 2, 3445 (2019)  10.1021/acsaem.9b00253.

See also

 List of battery types
 Flow battery
 Battery (electricity)
 Lead–acid battery
 Electrochemical cell
Electrochemical engineering
 Fuel cell
 Energy storage

References

External links
 Electricity Storage Association section on PSBs (including diagram)

Flow batteries
Sodium